Joel Sherman (born 1962), nicknamed "GI Joel", is a top American Scrabble expert and former world champion. He is chronicled in Stefan Fatsis's book Word Freak, in Eric Chaikin's film Word Wars, and in Scott Petersen's film Scrabylon.  He is also mentioned in Collins Gem's reference book. He was born in The Bronx, New York, and is an alumnus of the Bronx High School of Science.

His nickname is derived from a health problem, gastrointestinal reflux syndrome, and a pun on the G.I. Joe action figure.

Sherman's major Scrabble tournament victories include:
1997 World Scrabble Championship - Washington, D.C.
1998 Brand's Crossword Game King's Cup
2002 National Scrabble Championship - San Diego, California
2018 North American Scrabble Championship - Buffalo, New York

Since beginning his career in 1988, he has played at least 4,750 tournament games, winning about 64%, and earning at least $135,000 in prize money. He is director of NASPA Games Club #56, which meets on Thursday evenings in New York City.

Sherman holds the record for the highest score recorded in a tournament game played with the North American lexicon, having defeated Bradley Robbins 803-285 at a tournament in Stamford, Conn., on December 9, 2011.

References

External links

"Newbie's First Scrabble Lesson" by Joel R. Sherman

American Scrabble players
Living people
World Scrabble Championship winners
The Bronx High School of Science alumni
1962 births